Epicopeiidae is a family of insects in the order Lepidoptera. They are known as oriental swallowtail moths as they closely resemble some oriental swallowtail butterflies (e.g. red-bodied swallowtails). Epicopeiidae have highly varied structure in regards to body size and wing shape. Epicopeiidaen wing patterns are involved in complicated mimicry rings.

Genera
Amana Walker, 1855
Burmeia Minet, 2002
Chatamla Moore, 1881
Deuveia Minet, 2002
Epicopeia Westwood, 1841
Nossa Kirby, 1892
Mimaporia Wei & Yen, 2017
Parabraxas Leech, 1897
Psychostrophia Butler, 1877
Schistomitra Butler, 1881

Former genera
 Epicopiopsis Grunberg, 1908

References

 Natural History Museum Lepidoptera Genus Database
 Tree of Life
 Minet, J. and M. J. Scoble. 1999. The drepanoid/geometroid assemblage. Pages 301-320 in: Lepidoptera: Moths and Butterflies. 1. Evolution, Systematics, and Biogeography. Handbook of Zoology Vol. IV, Part 35. N. P. Kristensen, ed. De Gruyter, Berlin and New York.
 
 

Notes

 
Moth families